The Schoolgirl was a British weekly story paper aimed at girls. Published by Amalgamated Press (AP), The Schoolgirl ran in two series, the first from 1922 to 1923, and the second (essentially continuing a sister publication) from 1929 to 1940. 

Most stories in The Schoolgirl centred on the girls and staff of Cliff House School, a fictional establishment in Kent, on a clifftop overlooking the sea. Cliff House was the sister school of Greyfriars, where Billy Bunter was educated, and had its own equivalent, his sister Bessie Bunter. 

The Cliff House School was introduced in the Amalgamated Press boys' story paper The Magnet in 1909. Bessie Bunter and Cliff House School stories had been a regular feature of the first girls' story paper, The School Friend, beginning in 1919 and continuing through 1929.

Publication history 
The first series of The Schoolgirl was launched on 21 February 1922, and the publication was 28 pages long. It was subsequently reduced to 24 pages. The first series ended on 13 March 1923. 

The Schoolgirl was revived on 3 August 1929, picking up where The School Friend had left off. (The School Friend was canceled with the 27th July 1929 issue, with The Schoolgirl launching exactly one week later.) In May 1936, the fellow AP girls' story paper Schoolgirls' Own (launched in 1921) was merged into The Schoolgirl. 

The Schoolgirl continued until 18 May 1940, when paper rationing during the Second World War resulted in its merger with the sister story paper Girls' Crystal.

Content 
The Friardale Website described The Schoolgirl thusly:

References

1922 establishments in the United Kingdom
1940 disestablishments in the United Kingdom
Magazines established in 1922
Magazines established in 1929
Magazines disestablished in 1923
Magazines disestablished in 1940
Defunct magazines published in the United Kingdom
Weekly magazines published in the United Kingdom